John Hilton Grace FRS (21 May 1873 – 4 March 1958) was a British mathematician.  The Grace–Walsh–Szegő theorem is named in part after him.

Early life
He was born in Halewood, near Liverpool, the eldest of the six children of farmer William Grace and Elizabeth Hilton. He was educated at the village school and the Liverpool Institute. From there in 1892 he went up to Peterhouse, Cambridge to study mathematics.
His nephew, his younger sister's son, was the animal geneticist, Alan Robertson FRS.

Career
He was made a Fellow of Peterhouse in 1897 and became a Lecturer of Mathematics at Peterhouse and Pembroke colleges. An example of his work was his 1902 paper on The Zeros of a Polynomial. In 1903 he collaborated with Alfred Young on their book Algebra of Invariants.

He was elected a Fellow of the Royal Society in 1908.

He spent 1916–1917 as Visiting Professor in Lahore and deputised for Professor MacDonald at Aberdeen University during the latter part of the war.

In 1922 a breakdown in health forced his retirement from academic life and he spent the next part of his life in Norfolk.

He died in Huntingdon in 1958 and was buried in the family grave at St. Nicholas Church, Halewood.

Theorem on zeros of a polynomial
If
,

are two polynomials that satisfy the apolarity condition, i.e. , then every neighbourhood that includes all zeros of one polynomial also includes at least one zero of the other.

Corollary
Let  and  be defined as in the above theorem. If the zeros of both polynomials lie in the unit disk, then the zeros of the "composition" of the two, also lie in the unit disk.

Publications

References

External links

1873 births
1958 deaths
People from Halewood
19th-century British mathematicians
20th-century British mathematicians
Fellows of the Royal Society